Charles Millot (born Veljko Milojević; 23 December 1921 – 6 October 2003) was a Yugoslav-born French actor who made many film appearances over a 35-year period.

His notable film appearances include: The Train (1964), The Night of the Generals (1967), Waterloo (1970) as Marquis de Grouchy, French Connection II (1975), The Unbearable Lightness of Being (1988) and Eye of the Widow (1991). He died aged 81 on 6 October 2003 in Paris, France.

Selected filmography

OSS 117 Is Not Dead (1957) - Ralph
Line of Sight (1960) - Le chef des gangsters 
Der Teufel spielte Balalaika (1961) - Seidenwar
Les Ennemis (1962) - Borghine
Arsène Lupin contre Arsène Lupin (1962) - Le "docteur"
The Gentleman from Epsom (1962) - Le directeur de la boîte de nuit (uncredited)
The Eye of the Monocle (1962) - Commissaire Matlov
Une ravissante idiote (1964) - Fedor Alexandrovitch Balaniev
Requiem pour un caïd (1964) - Mick
The Train (1964) - Pesquet
The Great Spy Chase (1964) - Hans Muller
Passeport diplomatique agent K 8 (1965)
The Sleeping Car Murders (1965) - Le médecin légiste (uncredited)
Trans-Europ-Express (1966) - Franck
Un monde nouveau (1966) - Hans
The Poppy Is Also a Flower (1966) - Financier of Marko (uncredited)
The Nun (1966) - Monsieur Simonin
Le Solitaire passe à l'attaque (1966) - Vaecos
Triple Cross (1966) - 2nd Polish Interrogator
The Night of the Generals (1967) - Wionczek
To Commit a Murder (1967) - Un joueur de poker (uncredited)
Bang Bang (1967)
Mayerling (1968) - Count Taafe
Battle of Neretva (1969) - Djuka
Waterloo (1970) - Grouchy
Promise at Dawn (1970) - Film Director
Mourir d'aimer (1971) - Le faux juge
The Pine Tree in the Mountain (1971) - Domobranski satnik
La Nuit bulgare (1972) - Le chef de la délégation bulgare
L'affaire Crazy Capo (1973) - Slavio
The Marseille Contract (1974) - The Butler
Playing with Fire (1975) - Un ravisseur
French Connection II (1975) - Miletto
Le Futur aux trousses (1975)
Atentat u Sarajevu (1975) - Islednik
Anno Domini 1573 (1975) - Juraj Draskovic 
Death of a Corrupt Man (1977) - (uncredited)
Le Dernier Amant romantique (1978)
Vas-y maman (1978) - Le réceptionniste de l'hôtel à Franckfort
Little Girl in Blue Velvet (1978) - Tripot, a policeman
The Adolescent (1979) - Adrien, le maire
The Man to Destroy (1979) - Agent prvog reda
Bloodline (1979) - Commissaire Bloche
Tajna Nikole Tesle (1980) - Adams
High Voltage (1981) - Rus
The Falcon (1981) - Plemic na dvoru Jug Bogdana
L'Ombre rouge (1981) - Le père de Magda
Balles perdues (1983) - Mister Teufminn
Great Transport (1983) - Partizan koji pije vodu
Angel's Bite (1984) - Uncle
Crveni i crni (1985) - Upravnik
Lien de parenté (1986) - Werner
The Cry of the Owl (1987) - Le directeur
The Unbearable Lightness of Being (1988)
Una botta di vita (1988)
Donator (1989) - Batler François Yvette
Eye of the Widow (1991) - Carlos
Priez pour nous (1994) - L'homme russe (final film role)

References

External links
 

1921 births
2003 deaths
Yugoslav male film actors
People from Bjelovar
Yugoslav emigrants to France
Croatian emigrants to France